Camp Lamont also called Lamont Prisoner of War Base Camp was a World War II German Prisoners of War camp in the City of Lamont, California, 9 miles from Bakersfield in Kern County. Prisoners were given the option of volunteering to work crops in exchange for better living conditions.  Prisoners worked on cotton farms, picked oranges and other crops. With the labor shortage due to the World War II US draft, the offer to volunteer was given to many prisoners not seen as a risk. Prisoners came to Camp Lamont from Camp Cooke, northwest of Lompoc, California. Prisoners were taken each day by bus or truck to the fields to work. Camp Lamont was formed on December 2, 1944 by the US Department of Agriculture (USDA) transferring 16 acres of land to the US War Department for the US Army. The Camp closed on July 31, 1946.  Built at the camp were housing, a mess hall, fencing, guard towers and flood lights. At its peak about 900 German and Japanese POWs were housed at the camp. Camp Lamont ran two sub camps: Boswell Ranch opened in December 1944 in the city Corcoran, California in Kings County with 499 prisoners, closed October 5, 1945 and Camp Lakeland also called the Corcoran Prisoner of War Branch Camp in Corcoran with 631 prisoners, opened May 14, 1945 and closed October 5, 1945. After the war the Camp Lamont land was returned to the USDA. The land is now private property, with only a few foundations marking the spot of the former camp.

See also
 California during World War II
 Desert Training Center
 Weedpatch Camp near by Labor camp

References

Military installations in California
United States in World War II
1944 establishments in California